Marika Tuliniemi (born 19 July 1974) is a retired Finnish shot putter.

She finished seventh at the 1990 World Junior Championships, ninth at the 1992 World Junior Championships, won the 1993 European Junior Championships and finished eleventh at the 1994 European Championships. She also competed at the 1993 World Championships without reaching the final.

Tuliniemi won the Finnish championships in 1995 and 1997. Her personal best put was 17.93 metres, achieved in July 1993 in San Sebastian.

References

1974 births
Living people
Finnish female shot putters
World Athletics Championships athletes for Finland